Capital of Ivory Coast may refer to:
Yamoussoukro, the de jure capital
Abidjan, the de facto capital